Lois Bourne (10 April 1928 – 22 December 2017) who also went under the craft name Tanith, was an influential figure in the Neopagan religion of Wicca, having been involved in it from the early 1960s, and wrote a number of books on the subject. Originally initiated into Gardnerian Wicca by Gerald Gardner, she rose to become the high priestess of the Bricket Wood coven, the first Wiccan coven started by Gerald Gardner, which was based in Bricket Wood in Hertfordshire, working alongside the high priest Jack Bracelin.

Kirkus Reviews described her book Witch Amongst Us - The Autobiography of a Witch as "...sanely written and, in many ways, it is a convincing story of her life as a witch."

Lois Bourne died at the age of 89 in Watford, England on Friday night, 22 December 2017.

Bibliography
Witch Amongst Us - the Autobiography of a Witch (1979; republished 1989) 
Conversations with a Witch (1989; republished 2002) 
Dancing with Witches (1998; republished 2006) 
Spells to Change Your Life (2003)

Notes

English Wiccans
British occultists
1928 births
2017 deaths
20th-century English women writers
20th-century English writers
20th-century British writers
21st-century English women writers
Wiccan priestesses
Wiccan writers
Gardnerian Wiccans